Bagara khana or Bagara annam is a spiced rice delicacy prepared in Hyderabad, Telangana, India.  Bagar, meaning tempering, is a plain Biryani recipe without any vegetables or masala powders.  

Bagara rice is also a popular dish at weddings and functions in Hyderabad and Telangana Region.  For vegetarians in Telangana, this is a must have main dish.

Ingredients
The ingredients are long-grained rice, dark spices, green chillies.
Bagara rice pairs well with spicy curries like baghara baingan or dalcha.

References

Indian rice dishes
Hyderabadi cuisine
Telangana cuisine